Stanka Pencheva (July 9, 1929 – May 2014) was a Bulgarian writer.

She was born in Sliven and was educated there, going on to study Russian philology at Sofia University. She was an editor for Radio Sofia, for the Narodna Mladezh  magazine and for the Septemvri magazine. Pencheva has been a correspondent for the newspaper .

Her poems have been translated into English, French, Spanish, German, Russian, Polish, Czech, Slovak, Romanian, Italian and Hindi.

Selected works 
 Пълнолетие (Coming of age) (1952)
 Опъната струна (Stretched cord) (1957)
 Кладенец на птиците (Well of birds) (1960)
 „Вселена (Universe) (1964)
 Земя на огньовете (Land of fires) (1965)
 Горчива билка (Bitter herb) (1966)
 Ябълковата градина (Apple orchard) (1967)
 Есенно сияние (Autumn lights) (1968)
 Пясъчна лилия (Sand lily) (1972)
 Планета за двама (Planet for two) (1977)
 Избрана лирика (Selected lyrics) (1979)
 Недовършен свят (Unfinished world) (1982)
 Разкопки (Excavations) (1984)

Awards and recognition
Pencheva's awards include:
3007:  in poetry
2003:  award
1974: Order of Cyril and Methodius of 1st degree

In 2012 the annual national literary competition  "Stanka Pencheva" was established.

References 

1929 births
2014 deaths
Bulgarian poets
Bulgarian journalists
Bulgarian women poets
Bulgarian women journalists